Dimelaena thysanota (Mountain Lichen) is a crustose lichen in the family Physciaceae, found in the mountains of western North America and the Sonoran Desert.

References

Lichen species
Caliciales
Taxa named by Mason Hale
Taxa named by William Louis Culberson